Dick Clausen (1912 – December 2000) was an American football coach and college athletics administrator.  He served as the head football coach at Coe College from 1948 to 1955 and the University of New Mexico from 1956 to 1957, compiling a career college football record of 43–36–5.  Clausen was also the athletic director at the University of Arizona from 1958 to 1972.

Born in Vining, Iowa, Clausen attended high school in Sabula, Iowa, graduating in 1928.  At the University of Iowa, he played football as an end and baseball, as a first baseman.  Clausen died at in December 2000, at the age of 88, in Tucson, Arizona.

Head coaching record

College football

References

1912 births
2000 deaths
American football ends
Baseball first basemen
Arizona Wildcats athletic directors
Coe Kohawks football coaches
Iowa Hawkeyes baseball players
Iowa Hawkeyes football players
Iowa Hawkeyes men's track and field athletes
New Mexico Lobos football coaches
High school basketball coaches in Iowa
High school football coaches in Illinois
High school football coaches in Iowa
People from Jackson County, Iowa
People from Tama County, Iowa
Coaches of American football from Iowa
Players of American football from Iowa
Baseball players from Iowa